Yang Seung-jo (born 21 March 1959) is a South Korean lawyer and politician. He has served as the governor of South Chungcheong Province since 2018.

Early life
Yang Seung-jo was born in Cheonan, South Chungcheong Province to a Confucian scholar, Yang Tae-seok and his mother, Lee Jong-ki.

He passed the 37th judicial examination in 1995, completed 27 training courses and worked as a lawyer.

Political career
In 2004, Yang Seung-jo ran for a Member of the National Assembly in Cheonan and he won the election. He served as the chief of staff for Chairman of the Democratic Party Sohn Hak-kyu and served as the head of the election campaign committee for Sohn Hak-kyu during the 2012 Democratic Party presidential primary. And he became a member of the Supreme council of the Democratic Party in May 2013.

Yang was elected governor of South Chungcheong Province in the 2018 local elections.

References

External links
 

1959 births
Living people
Minjoo Party of Korea politicians
People from South Chungcheong Province
Governors of South Chungcheong Province